The Enlarged City School District of Middletown serves the City of Middletown, Orange County, New York, and adjacent areas.

It operates six schools:

Presidential Park Elementary School - Grades K-5
Maple Hill Elementary School - Grades K-5
William A. Carter Elementary School - Grades K-5
Monhagen Middle School - Grades 6-8
Twin Towers Middle School - Grades 6-8
Middletown High School - Grades 9-12

External links
District Website

School districts in New York (state)
Education in Orange County, New York